Anne St. Marie (1926–1986) was an American fashion model, also known as Anne Sainte-Marie, and one of the leading models of the 1950s.

She was born in Los Angeles County on June 16, 1926.
St. Marie was married to the photographer Tom Palumbo until her death in 1986 from lung cancer.

St. Marie was involved in the making of Puzzle of a Downfall Child (1970) in which Faye Dunaway played a character in the film who had been inspired by St. Marie's life.

References

External links
Vogue photo gallery

1986 deaths
American female models
Place of death missing
Place of birth missing
1926 births
20th-century American women
20th-century American people
People from Los Angeles County, California
Female models from California